Gladstone railway station is located on the North Coast line in Queensland, Australia. It serves the city of Gladstone.

It is a major hub for Central Queensland rail services, and is a major freight depot.

Services
Gladstone is served by long-distance Traveltrain services; the Spirit of Queensland, Spirit of the Outback and Rockhamption Tilt Train.

Transport links
Gladstone station is served by CDC Gladstone routes 500 and 501.

References

External links

Gladstone station Queensland's Railways on the Internet

Gladstone, Queensland
Regional railway stations in Queensland
North Coast railway line, Queensland
Buildings and structures in Central Queensland